"Darte un Beso" (English: "Give You a Kiss") is a 2013 bachata song by American singer Prince Royce. The single became an international hit for Prince Royce in the United States, Latin America and Spain. At the Latin Grammy Awards of 2014, the song received three nominations including Song of the Year, Record of the Year, and Best Tropical Song. It is also recognized as one of Prince Royce's signature songs. A 2014 Portuguese-language sertanejo version was made as "Te Dar um Beijo" with Brazilian musician Michel Teló featuring Prince Royce becoming a hit in its own right in Brazil.

Music video
The music video was released late August 2013. In a beach, Royce falls in love for a young woman and sings to her about how he feels. The video ends with the woman turning out to be a mermaid. The song reached number one on multiple Billboard Latin music charts. As of April 2021, the video has received over 1.22 billion views on YouTube.

Te Dar um Beijo

In 2014, Royce and Brazilian musician Michel Teló recorded a Portuguese-language version in sertanejo under the title "Te Dar Um Beijo".

For marketing purposes outside Brazil, this Portuguese language version was launched initially as Prince Royce featuring Michel Teló on April 24, 2014, and for promotion within Brazil as Teló featuring Royce on May 19, 2014.

In a report in Billboard, the collaboration came together when Telo reached out to Royce's camp because he wanted to record "Darte un Beso" in Portuguese. Royce said: "They sent me a rough demo and I said, 'why don't we just do it together?'".

Chart performance

Weekly charts

Year-end charts

Decade-end charts

All-time charts

Certifications

Awards and nominations

See also
List of Billboard number-one Latin songs of 2013
List of Billboard number-one Latin songs of 2014

References

2013 songs
2013 singles
Prince Royce songs
Bachata songs
Spanish-language songs
Number-one singles in Colombia
Number-one singles in the Dominican Republic
Songs written by Prince Royce
Songs written by Andrés Castro
Sony Music Latin singles
2014 singles
Michel Teló songs